Live Celtic Folk Music is a live album by Battlefield Band, released in 1998 on the Munich Records label. It was recorded in 1980 at the Winterfolkfestival, held in Dordrecht, The Netherlands.

Track listing
 "Lord Huntly's Cave/The Lady in the Bottle/Stewart Chisholm's Walkabout" – 5:26 (from Stand Easy/Preview 1980) 
 "The Gallant Grahams" – 3:08 (from Alan Reid & Brian McNeill's Sidetracks 1981) 
 "I Hae Laid a Herrin' in Salt/My Wife's a Wanton Wee Thing/The Banks of the Allan" – 3:34 (from Stand Easy/Preview 1980) 
 "Blackhall Rocks" – 2:54 (from Home Is Where the Van Is 1980) 
 "Athole Highlanders" – 2:46  
 "Miss Drummond of Perth/Fiddler's Joy/Traditional Reel/The Shetland Fiddler" – 3:10 (from Stand Easy 1979) 
 "The Lads O' the Fair" – 3:55 (from Home Is Where the Van Is 1980) 
 "74th Highlanders' Farewell to Edinburg/The Cup of Tea" – 4:08 (from Stand Easy/Preview 1980) 
 "Joe McGann's Fiddle/Center's Bonnet" – 5:46 (from Stand Easy/Preview 1980)

Personnel

Battlefield Band
 Alan Reid
 Brian McNeill
 Duncan MacGillivray 
 Ged Foley

Sources and links
 

Battlefield Band albums
1998 live albums